Comfort Asamoah was a Ghanaian politician. She was a member of parliament representing the Ashanti Region from 1960 to 1965 and the member of parliament for Asante Mampong from 1965 to 1966.

Asamoah was among the first women to enter the parliament of Ghana in 1960 under the representation of the people (women members) act. She was among the 10 women who were elected unopposed on 27 June 1960 on the ticket Convention People's Party. Prior to entering parliament, she served with the Workers Brigade from 1957 to 1960.

See also
 List of MPs elected in the 1965 Ghanaian parliamentary election

References

Ghanaian MPs 1956–1965
Ghanaian MPs 1965–1966
20th-century Ghanaian women politicians
Convention People's Party (Ghana) politicians
1934 births
2004 deaths